IC 1101 is a class S0 supergiant (cD) lenticular galaxy at the center of the Abell 2029 galaxy cluster. It possesses a diffuse core which is the largest known core of any galaxy to date, and also hosts a supermassive black hole that is one of the largest black holes known.
The galaxy was discovered on 19 June 1790, by the British astronomer William Herschel.

Characteristics

Morphology

The galaxy is classified as a supergiant elliptical (E) to lenticular (S0) and is the brightest galaxy in A2029 (hence its other designation A2029-BCG; BCG meaning brightest cluster galaxy). The galaxy's morphological type is debated due to it possibly being shaped like a flat disc but only visible from Earth at its broadest dimensions. A morphology of S0- (Hubble stage -2; see Hubble stage for details) has been given by the Third Reference Catalogue of Bright Galaxies (RC3) in 1991.

Components and Structure
Like most large galaxies, IC 1101 is populated by a number of metal-rich stars, some of which are seven billion years older than the Sun, making it appear golden yellow in color. It has a bright radio source at the center, which is likely associated with an ultramassive black hole in the mass range of  measured using core dynamical models, or alternatively at  using gas accretion rate and growth modelling, which would make IC 1101's black hole one of the most massive known to date. The estimates of the mass of IC 1101's black hole are near the upper bound of cosmological limits, and is referred to as an "overmassive" black hole.

IC 1101's Mass to light ratio has been described as being anomalously high. The galaxy also has a unique velocity dispersion profile, which indicates a massive Dark Matter halo. It accretes roughly 450 solar masses per year. In spite of lying the center of a large inflow of gas, the galaxy lacks optical nuclear emission at its center as well as signs of recent star formation. There is also no evidence of dust lanes in the core.

The diffuse and depleted core is also roughly an order of magnitude larger than the cores of other large elliptical galaxies, such as NGC 4889 and NGC 1600. Thus, the massive core is believed to have formed due to black holes scouring the galactic core. This, along with the stellar mass deficit at the core and the somewhat bluer color of IC 1101's halo suggests that IC 1101 underwent a large number of major galaxy mergers, with the number of major mergers likely being around ~10, or 10-20. However, when examining large and diffuse galactic cores, caution must be taken, as various estimates may differ between the computer models used. As an example, Holmberg 15A was originally claimed to have the largest galactic core of any galaxy but other studies proved otherwise, either not finding a core or estimating a smaller size for it.

IC 1101's major axis is oriented in the northeast to southwest direction. Its components, the spheroid and its intermediate scale are well-aligned, but its halo is twisted from the galaxy's other components. Its isophotes are predominantly somewhat boxy, although its ellipticity increases farther and farther away from its center. Closer to the core, the ellipticity increases, suggesting a nuclear disc. The nuclear component might be due to an unresolved double nucleus, produced by a low intensity Active Galactic Nucleus (AGN) as well as the remnant stellar nuclei of an accreted satellite that had been tidally disrupted by the central Supermassive Black Hole. The elliptical galaxies NGC 44386B, NGC 5419, VCC 128 contain two point-sources, producing high ellipticities. The NRAO VLA sky-survey detected a radio source near IC 1101, suggesting a possible AGN. Another, weaker radio source has also been detected nearby. Thus, a double AGN cannot be ruled out.

Like most BCGs, IC 1101 has a massive and diffuse stellar halo and has excessive halo light. The halo extends throughout a large part of Abell 2029 and can be easily traced out to several hundred kiloparsecs from the galaxy’s center. The galaxy's halo, rising ellipticity at larger radii from the center and its intermediate scale profile seem to be the reasons why IC 1101 is classified as a lenticular galaxy In RC3.

Size
IC 1101 is considered a large galaxy characterized by an extensive, diffuse halo. Defining the size of a galaxy varies according to the method used in the astronomical literature. Photographic plates of blue light from the galaxy (sampling stars excluding the diffuse halo) yield an effective radius (the radius within which half the light is emitted) of  based on an earlier distance measurement. The authors of the study identifying the halo conclude that IC 1101 is "possibly one of the largest and most luminous galaxies in the universe".

Both measurements are based on the currently-accepted distance to IC 1101. This would make it one of the largest and most luminous galaxies known, though there are other galaxies with larger isophotal diameter measurements (such as NGC 623, Abell 1413 BCG, and ESO 306-17).

Distance
The distance to IC 1101 has also been uncertain, with different methods across different wavelengths producing varying results. The RC3 catalogue gave a nearly similar value of z=0.078, based on optical emission lines, a value conformed to as recently as 2017 based on luminosity, stellar mass, and velocity dispersion functions, all yielding distances of  based on the modern value of the Hubble constant H0 = 67.8 km/s/Mpc; the currently accepted values.

Formation
Massive galaxies are thought to build up hierarchically, when smaller galaxies merge, forming larger and larger galaxies. Due to their high luminosities and distinct properties, BCGs have likely experienced numerous galactic interactions and mergers. The lack of other bright and luminous galaxies other than IC 1101 at the center of the Abell 2029 galaxy cluster suggests that they were absorbed and consumed ("chewed-Up") by the nascent IC 1101. Since the halo is somewhat flattened, the halo might have assumed the distribution of the bright luminous galaxies as they were consumed. The depleted core and other characteristics of IC 1101 such as the halo component suggests that the galaxy underwent numerous galactic mergers and interactions. The smoothness of the halo suggests that it formed early in the history of the cluster. Using some methods to estimate the possible number of major mergers that IC 1101 has been involved in results in an unrealistically large number of major galactic mergers, about 76 or even greater. Further examination reduces the number of major mergers to ~10-20, or less than 10. The somewhat offset core of IC 1101 with respect to its isophotes also supports this. Now, the Abell 2029 galaxy cluster is among the most relaxed clusters in the universe.

See also
List of galaxies
List of largest galaxies
List of most massive black holes

Notes

References

External links

 
 
 

Elliptical galaxies
Virgo (constellation)
1101
54167
09752
17900619